Fathimath Zoona (20 October 1965) is a Maldivian singer and a recipient of several awards including one Gaumee Film Award and  one Aafathis Award.

Early life and career
Fathimath Zoona was born on 20 October 1965 in Male'. During her childhood days, she frequently listened to old Bollywood songs and decided to pursue a career in music industry. In 1994, she participated in the "Basic Voice Training Course" which resulted in her receiving several offers from music directors and producers to sing for their films, albums, advertisements and national events. In 1998, her seductive rendition of the song "Uff Heevanee" in the horror classic Fathis Handhuvaru fetched her first Aafathis Award for Best Female Playback Singer. The following year, she released her debut studio album, Kastholhu.

In 2001, the Government of Maldives honoured her with the National Award of Recognition. Zoona received her first Gaumee Film Award for Best Female Playback Singer with her emotional rendition in the song "Magey Loabivaa Ey" from the film Hithuge Edhun (2006). Ahmed Adhushan from Mihaaru placed her in the top five female vocalists of Maldives and noted that she is "one of the most versatile singers we have in the industry who can belt slow to fast paced songs with much ease".

Discography

Feature film

Short Film

Television and Web Series

Non-Film Songs

Religious / Madhaha

Filmography

Accolades

References 

Living people
People from Malé
1965 births
Maldivian playback singers